Defending champion Novak Djokovic defeated Richard Gasquet in the final, 6–3, 6–2 to win the men's singles tennis title at the 2012 Canadian Open.

Seeds
All seeds receive a bye into the second round.

Draw

Finals

Top half

Section 1

Section 2

Bottom half

Section 3

Section 4

Qualifying

Seeds

Qualifiers

Lucky loser
  Matthew Ebden

Draw

First qualifier

Second qualifier

Third qualifier

Fourth qualifier

Fifth qualifier

Sixth qualifier

References
General

Specific

2012 ATP World Tour
Men's Singles